California's 39th district may refer to:

 California's 39th congressional district
 California's 39th State Assembly district
 California's 39th State Senate district